The Max Bell Centre is a multipurpose athletic facility located on the University of Manitoba campus in Winnipeg, Manitoba, Canada. It is located across the street from IG Field and next to the Investors Group Athletic Centre.  Inside the complex is the Wayne Fleming Arena as well as the James Daly Fieldhouse, an indoor track and fieldhouse.

The ice hockey arena is open year-round and has a seating capacity of 1,600.  It is home to the Manitoba Bisons men's and women's hockey teams and was also used as a venue for inline hockey during the 1999 Pan American Games.  The arena has also been host to the WHL team Winnipeg Ice since it relocated to Winnipeg in 2019. Prior to the start of the 2019-2020 Western Hockey League regular season, seating capacity at Wayne Fleming Arena was increased from 1,400 to 1,600, with a new balcony added on the east side of the arena. The balcony includes Premium Loge Seating which provide patrons with an excellent elevated view of the ice surface. In addition, a Fort Garry Brewing Co. Party Lounge beneath the loge provides a close-up view of the action at ice level. As part of that expansion, a new centre-hung scoreboard with video replay capabilities was added, as well as additional food and beverage kiosks. 

In 2021, a new energy-efficient ice plant was installed in the arena with funding from the Government of Canada and the University of Manitoba.

The fieldhouse features two tracks and a large multipurpose infield. It has a seating capacity of 1,350 for track meets and other sporting events. The fieldhouse hosts the Manitoba Bisons track and field team.

The complex is named after Canadian businessman and philanthropist Max Bell. The hockey arena portion of the complex is named in honour of the late Wayne Fleming. Fleming played for and coached the Bisons men's hockey team before moving onto a distinguished coaching career in professional hockey. The fieldhouse portion of the complex is named after the late James Morgan Cuthbert Daly who was a avid runner and coach in Winnipeg.

References

External links
 
 

Sports venues completed in 1981
University of Manitoba
Indoor ice hockey venues in Canada
Sports venues in Winnipeg
University sports venues in Canada
Athletics (track and field) venues in Canada
Venues of the 1999 Pan American Games
Indoor arenas in Manitoba
1981 establishments in Manitoba